The 3rd West Virginia Infantry Regiment was an infantry regiment that served in the Union Army during the American Civil War. On May 23, 1863, it was converted to a mounted infantry by Brigadier General William W. Averell. The regiment was immediately sent to a camp for instruction and supplied. In 1864, it was converted to the 6th West Virginia Volunteer Cavalry Regiment.

Service
The 3rd West Virginia Infantry Regiment fought at the Battle of McDowell on May, 1862 and the Battle of Cross Keys, June 8, 1862, under LTC Francis W. Thompson, part of BG Robert Milroy's Brigade made up of 5 Virginia regiments loyal to the Union (units which later were designated West Virginian) and 1 Ohio regiment and 3 Ohio artillery batteries. The regiment was converted to the 6th West Virginia Cavalry Regiment on January 26, 1864.

Richard W. Blue was an officer in it.

References
The Civil War Archive

See also
West Virginia Units in the Civil War
West Virginia in the Civil War

Units and formations of the Union Army from West Virginia
1861 establishments in Virginia
Military units and formations established in 1861
Military units and formations disestablished in 1864